Klaudius Harsch (born 23 January 2001) is a German curler from Rastatt, Germany.

Career
Harsch made his first appearance at the World Junior-B Curling Championships in 2018. There, his team of Sixten Totzek, Joshua Sutor, Jan-Luca Häg and Till Wunderlich won the bronze medal game, sending them to the 2018 World Junior Curling Championships. At the championship, the team just missed the playoffs with a 4–5 record after losing their final round robin draw to Canada's Tyler Tardi. Their fifth-place finish earned the team a spot at the 2019 World Junior Curling Championships without having to qualify through the B Championship. They did not have a good performance at the 2019 championship, finishing with a 3–6 round robin record and being relegated to the B Championship for the following season. They would, however, qualify again through the 2019 World Junior-B Curling Championships in December 2019 to secure a spot at the 2020 World Junior Curling Championships. There, Harsch and his German rink would have their best finish to date, qualifying for the playoffs for the first time with a 6–3 record. They then lost to Canada's Jacques Gauthier in the semifinal 7–4 and Scotland's James Craik in the bronze medal game 6–5, settling for fourth place.

For the 2020–21 season, Harsch began skipping his own team. He competed in his first World Men's Curling Championship that season as alternate for the German National Team skipped by Sixten Totzek. The team finished in tenth place with a 4–9 record.

Harsch plays mixed doubles curling with his partner Pia-Lisa Schöll. The duo represented Germany at the 2019 World Mixed Doubles Qualification Event, finishing with a perfect 8–0 and qualifying for the 2020 World Mixed Doubles Curling Championship. They would not, however, get the chance to compete at the championship as it was cancelled due to the COVID-19 pandemic.

Personal life
Harsch is a student.

Teams

References

External links

2001 births
Living people
German male curlers
People from Rastatt
People from Baden-Baden
Sportspeople from Karlsruhe (region)
21st-century German people